Synap is an intelligent learning management system that uses the principles of spaced repetition to help people learn more information, which they can recall in the long term, in less time. Spaced repetition has been shown to increase the rate of memorisation.

History
Synap was developed by two doctors at Leeds Medical School. Having used spaced repetition software such as Anki in the past, they created a website that allowed students to write crowdsourced quizzes in a Multiple Choice Question (MCQ) format.

The early version of Synap operated under the name 'MyCQs', which was released as a native iOS application and website in 2012, and initially gained popularity amongst UK medical students

During this time, CEO James Gupta was recruited as the Chief Technology Officer for JumpIn, a student-focused taxi booking and sharing app. The company was acquired by taxi firm Addison Lee in 2014, after which James returned to focus on MyCQs with his co-founder and CTO Omair Vaiyani.

In 2014, MyCQs received funding and mentoring from Jisc, an education technology charity, and received a scholarship from The University of Leeds. In 2015, the team shifted focus by integrating more algorithms based on educational psychology research, and started to describe itself as a 'personalised learning' platform. This also led to the company being renamed Synap

In August 2015, Synap launched a successful equity crowdfunding campaign on Crowdcube. James and Omair graduated from medical school in 2017 and focused on Synap full time, growing the team and setting up offices In Leeds. 

In 2020, the Synap team has grown and has remained in Leeds with an office in Castleton Mill.

Functionality

Synap is designed with the end-user in mind. By making it easy for people to access their courses, assignments, or question banks Synap ensures that less time is spent searching and more time is spent learning and practising. Synap’s proprietary Spaced Learning algorithms are based on the principles of spaced repetition. The algorithms look at what users are doing well, and what they need to work on to create short bitesize quizzes that typically only take a few minutes a day, and that can be done on any device.

Infrastructure
Synap was originally developed on Facebook's Parse platform. In January 2016, Facebook announced that Parse would be closing down, and advised developers to migrate their apps to other services. As of March 2016, Synap has been hosted on Amazon Web Services, using the newly open-sourced Parse Server, which itself uses Node.js. The website is developed in Ember.js, and uses a MongoDB database, making Synap an example of full-stack JavaScript development.

Recognition and awards
Synap has been featured in The Oxford Public Health Magazine.

In December 2015, Synap was listed as one of 10 British AI companies to look out for by Business Insider.

In 2017, Synap was in the top 10 Northern Startups named by Tech Nation. 

In 2017, Synap was won the Northern Stars award from Tech North. 

In 2018, Synap won Leeds Startup of the Year at the Leeds Digital Festival.

See also 
 Spaced repetition
 Metacognition
 Educational psychology
 Educational technology

References

External links
 Official Synap Website
 Company Blog

Crowdsourcing
Educational software companies
British educational websites
Spaced repetition software